Tagulinus is a genus of spiders in the family Thomisidae. It was first described in 1903 by Simon. , it contains only one species, Tagulinus histrio, found in Vietnam.

References

Thomisidae
Monotypic Araneomorphae genera
Spiders of Asia